Putinversteher or Putin-Versteher, female form Putinversteherin, integrated form Putinversteher*in, is a German neologism and a political buzzword (Putin + verstehen), which literally translates "Putin understander",  i.e., "one who understands Putin". It is a pejorative reference to politicians and pundits who express empathy to Vladimir Putin and may also be translated as "Putin-Empathizer". Similar words are Russlandversteher or Russland-Versteher.

Origin 
The term Putin-Versteher was first used in March 2014 by the German publications Spiegel Online and welt.de. This was right after the Annexation of Crimea by the Russian Federation, which started on 27 February 2014. Der Spiegel used the term when Sahra Wagenknecht and other members of the political party Die Linke said that the annexation of Crimea was understandable and justified. They argued that Russia's "legitimate interests in the region" must be taken into consideration. That same month Die Welt labeled some other people that went way too far in their understanding for Putin. Foremost was Social Democratic German chancellor Gerhard Schröder, who was so close to Putin that it irritated even his most ardent admirers. 

After the 2014 annexation of Crimea, many Putinversteher "backtracked or at least stopped stating their support publicly". After the 24 February 2022 Russian invasion of Ukraine had started, many "Putin-caressers" in Germany "came under increasing pressure to publicly distance themselves from Vladimir Putin amid accusations that they were bringing shame on the country and themselves." The early April 2022 Bucha massacre made that for most people "the arguments typically used by Putinversteher had definitely lost their credibility". For many, "Bucha had reduced the invasion to a Manichean conflict between good and evil". It makes that by April 2022, the term Putinversteher has a different moral connotation than in March 2014.

Putin-Versteher was among frequent suggestions for the Un-word of the year 2014, but the panel of linguists favored the word Lügenpresse ("lying press"). Among the runners-up was a similar term, "Russland-Versteher" (Russia-Understander). Although the word was used in English media as early as 2014, it became an international term in the wake of the 2022 Russian invasion.

The scope of the term and its usage

Characterization 
A major cornerstone  of "Putin-friendly" attitude is the "legitimate interests of Russia" in the post-Soviet states, while another typical trait is anti-Americanism. A similar term is Russlandversteher, "Russia understander".

The circle of people that may be described as Putinversteher is politically heterogeneous and includes figures on both the left and right. It also includes businesspeople with business interests in Russia. Paul Roderick Gregory wrote that they "serve as Putin's first line of defense against meaningful European sanctions for the Annexation of Crimea".

Academic Taras Kuzio offers literary criticism of Russian studies scholars that he defines as falling into the Putinversteher moniker, in particular to their response to the Russo-Ukrainian War. In his definition, he calls these scholars "those who seek to always deflect criticism from Russian President Putin and Russia and lay blame on Ukraine, NATO, the EU, and the US."

Putinversteher in Germany 
In 2014 the group of German Putinversteher was quite large. Foremost was of course Gerhard Schröder, but in March 2014 many others were mentioned. The feminist journalist Alice Schwarzer said that 96.77% of the inhabitants of Crimea wanted to belong to Russia. Peter Gauweiler of the CSU had spoken for understanding of and cooperation with Russia on 5 March 2014. the former European Commissioner Günter Verheugen (SPD) was as careless to call the Svoboda members of the Ukrainian government true facsists . Alexander Gauland of the Alternative for Germany had previously said that Russia would never condone the loss of "Holy Kiev, birthplace of Russia". Sahra Wagenknecht defended the annexation of Crimea by pointing to the anti-Russian sentiment in Kiev and repeating other Russian propaganda. Armin Laschet of the CDU spoke of anti-Putin populism  in Germany. Gernot Erler (SPD) had called for "an end to Russia Bashing".

While one might expect that members of the left wing Alliance 90/The Greens would be part of this list, its leader Katrin Göring-Eckardt took a clear stand in Mach 2014. She accused Sahra Wagenknecht and Die Linke of being against all foreign intervention, except when it was done by Russia.

Paul Roderick Gregory described the former Chancellor of Germany Gerhard Schröder (SPD) as "the most egregious Putinversteher." Gregory wrote that Schröder might be susceptible to Putin's pressure because he chaired the board of Nord Stream 1 with an official one million dollar honorarium. Gregory cites that Schröder called to respect Russian "sensitivities" and seconds the Russian argument which compares separatism of Crimea with that of Kosovo.

The term was applied to the former German Chancellor, Helmut Schmidt (SPD) by The Economist, Forbes Magazine and in Schmidt's biography book. Schmidt argued that Putin's annexation of Crimea, while illegitimate, was "understandable". In an interview he said: "If you placed yourself in Putin's shoes, you would likely react in the case of Crimea as he did".

By 2022 the numbers of the Putinversteher had dwindled. In February 2022 Friederike Haupt, a political observer from Frankfurter Allgemeine wrote that Putinversteher could be found primarily in the right-wing party AfD and the socialistic party Die Linke, as well as in parts of the SPD. An example of a journalist that continued to be a Putinversteher is Gabriele Krone-Schmalz.

Putinversteher in France 
In France, Marine Le Pen and her party the National Rally were deemed to be Putinversteher. In May 2014 she praised Putin as a patriot and defender of the Christian heritage of European civilization. In September 2014 her party got a loan of 9 million Euro from the First Czech Russian Bank (FCRB) based in Moscow. While this was not illegal, it of course cast heavy doubt on her objectivity towards Putin. In January 2017 she condoned the Russian annexation of Crimea. On 24 March 2017 Putin officially received Marine le Pen in the Kremlin.

After the 24 February 2022 Russian invasion of Ukraine Le Pen's party hastily removed a picture of the 2017 visit to Putin from its propaganda material. Le Pen now denied being a friend of Putin. In April 2022 NR members of the European Parliament broke their tradition of opposing resolutions against Russia by being absent.

On the left wing, Jean-Luc Mélenchon leader of La France Insoumise fit the traditional profile of a Putinversteher. In March 2014 he legitimized the invasion of Crimea as "a security measure against an adventurous Putschist regime in which neo nazi's have a despicable influence". By October 2022 La France Insoumise had changed its tune and spoke of a Russian war of Aggression. Nevertheless, in November 2022 his party in the European Parliament abstained from declaring Russia a State Sponsor of Terrorism.

Putinversteher in the Netherlands 
After the February 2022 invasion of Ukraine, the number of Putinversteher in the Netherlands quickly diminished. In October 2022 Forum for Democracy was practically the only Dutch party that was still enthusiastic about Putin. Therefore, the Labour Party and Greens wanted to bar Forum from confidential meetings about military aid for Ukraine. This move was publicly supported by the former head of the General Intelligence and Security Service Rob Bertholee.

Outside of the representative institutions Dutch Putinversteher now act very carefully. Nevertheless, on 19 December 2022 members of the 'Golfgroep' petitioned the Dutch government to promote negotiations between Russia and Ukraine. The petition was signed by about two dozen university staff and some elderly ex-politicians. The wording of the petition suggested that both sides had an equal share in causing the war. War crimes were not mentioned. An ironic remark about the petition from the left side was that it: at least admitted that Russia had invaded Ukraine.

Putinversteher in Russia 
The term was embraced in Russia, where, e.g., a company named "Putinversteher" sells memorabilia (rings, clothes, etc.) with Putin imagery.

See also 
 Fellow traveller, or less charitably, useful idiot
Mitläufer

External links 

 Sarah Hucal: German term 'Putinversteher' goes international, Deutsche Welle, April 6, 2022.
 Gregor Peter Schmitz: "Putin-Versteher" im Westen, comment on Radio Deutschlandfunk, February 26, 2022. (German)
 Alice Schwarzer: Warum ich trotz allem Putin verstehe! ("Why I understand Putin despite everything!"), March 18, 2014. (German)

References

Notes

2010s neologisms
German words and phrases
Political neologisms
Vladimir Putin
Political slurs for people